William Turner Jolley (3 August 1923 – 28 April 1995) was an English cricketer. Jolley was a right-handed batsman who bowled right-arm fast. He was born at Smallthorne, Staffordshire.

Jolley made his first-class debut for Lancashire against Nottinghamshire at Old Trafford in the 1947 County Championship, with him playing one further first-class match in that same season against Hampshire. He took 5 wickets in his two matches, with best figures of 4/31, while with the bat he scored 21 runs with a high score of 13. After leaving Lancashire, Jolley debuted in minor counties cricket for Staffordshire against Durham in the 1949 Minor Counties Championship. He played minor counties cricket for Staffordshire until 1956, making a total of 25 appearances.

He died at Stoke-on-Trent, Staffordshire on 28 April 1995.

References

External links
William Jolley at ESPNcricinfo
William Jolley at CricketArchive

1923 births
1995 deaths
People from Smallthorne
English cricketers
Lancashire cricketers
Staffordshire cricketers